Communauté d'agglomération Chartres Métropole is an intercommunal structure, centred on the city of Chartres. It is located in the Eure-et-Loir department, in the Centre-Val de Loire region, northern France. It was created in January 2013. Its seat is in Chartres. Its area is 858.3 km2. Its population was 136,218 in 2017, of which 38,578 in Chartres proper.

Composition
The communauté d'agglomération consists of the following 66 communes:

Allonnes
Amilly
Bailleau-l'Évêque
Barjouville
Berchères-les-Pierres
Berchères-Saint-Germain
Boisville-la-Saint-Père
Boncé
Bouglainval
La Bourdinière-Saint-Loup
Briconville
Challet
Champhol
Champseru
Chartainvilliers
Chartres
Chauffours
Cintray
Clévilliers
Coltainville
Corancez
Le Coudray
Dammarie
Dangers
Denonville
Ermenonville-la-Grande
Fontenay-sur-Eure
Francourville
Fresnay-le-Comte
Fresnay-le-Gilmert
Gasville-Oisème
Gellainville
Houville-la-Branche
Houx
Jouy
Lèves
Lucé
Luisant
Maintenon
Mainvilliers
Meslay-le-Grenet
Meslay-le-Vidame
Mignières
Mittainvilliers-Vérigny
Moinville-la-Jeulin
Morancez
Nogent-le-Phaye
Nogent-sur-Eure
Oinville-sous-Auneau
Ollé
Poisvilliers
Prunay-le-Gillon
Roinville
Saint-Aubin-des-Bois
Saint-Georges-sur-Eure
Saint-Léger-des-Aubées
Saint-Prest
Sandarville
Santeuil
Sours
Theuville
Thivars
Umpeau
Ver-lès-Chartres
Vitray-en-Beauce
Voise

References

Chartres Metropole
Chartres Metropole